The 2022 FIBA Under-16 Asian Championship was the sixth edition of the under-16 basketball championship in the International Basketball Federation's FIBA Asia zone. The tournament was held in Doha, Qatar from 12 to 19 June 2022. This marked the return of the Under-16 competition which was last held 4 years ago in China.

 successfully defended their U16 title against  in the Final, 94-63, while  retained the Bronze Medal after defeating first-time semifinalists  in the Battle for Third Place, 89-62. All four of the semifinalists were qualified to the 2022 FIBA Under-17 Basketball World Cup in Spain as Asian representatives.

Participating teams
The following are the list of teams that entered the tournament. 

Includes current ranking prior to the start of the tournament (in parenthesis).

Host nation (1)
 (NR)
Defending champions (1)
  (8)
Central Asia (1)
 (80)
 East Asia (2)
 (32)
 (27)
 Persian Gulf (2)
 (43)
 (69)

South Asia (1)
 (50)
Southeast Asia (2)
 (66)
 (24)
West Asia (2)
 (17)
 (35)
FIBA Oceania (1)
 (30)

Withdraw

Preliminary round
All times are local (UTC+3).

Group A

Group B

Group C

Group D

Final round

Bracket

Classification 5th–8th

Qualification to Quarterfinals

Quarterfinals

5–8th place semifinals

Semifinals

Seventh place game

Fifth place game

Third place game

Final

Qualified teams for FIBA U17 Basketball World Cup
The following four teams from FIBA Asia qualify for the 2022 FIBA Under-17 Basketball World Cup.

Final ranking

Awards

All-Tournament Team
 C  Rocco Zikarsky
 F  Kushal Singh
 F  Yuto Kawashima (MVP)
 G  Nic Book
 G  Suguru Ishiguchi

References

2021
International basketball competitions hosted by Qatar
June 2022 sports events in Qatar
2022 in Qatari sport